The 1990 Bulgarian Cup Final was played at the Hristo Botev Stadium in Gabrovo on 30 May 1990, and was contested between the sides of CSKA Sofia and Sliven. The match was won by Sliven.

Match

Details

See also
1989–90 A Group
1990 Cup of the Soviet Army Final

References 

Bulgarian Cup finals
PFC CSKA Sofia matches
Cup Final